Nymphoides montana, commonly known as marshwort, is an aquatic plant of the family Menyanthaceae native to southeastern Australia.

References

montana
Freshwater plants
Flora of New South Wales
Taxa named by Helen Isobel Aston